Schizaphis minuta, also known as Schizaphis (Schizaphis) minuta, is an aphid in the superfamily Aphidoidea in the order Hemiptera. It was originally found from tropical Asian countries, but discovered from United States recently.

References

 http://digitalcommons.unl.edu/insectamundi/539/
 http://animaldiversity.org/accounts/Schizaphis_minuta/classification/
 http://aphid.speciesfile.org/Common/basic/Taxa.aspx?TaxonNameID=1166092

Agricultural pest insects
Hemiptera of Asia
Aphidini